Ware Rural District  was a rural district in Hertfordshire, England from 1894 to 1974, covering an area in the east of the county.

Evolution
The district had its origins in the Ware Rural Sanitary District. This had been created under the Public Health Act 1872, giving public health and local government responsibilities for rural areas to the existing boards of guardians of poor law unions. The Ware Rural Sanitary District covered the area of the Ware Poor Law Union excluding the town of Ware.

Under the Local Government Act 1894, rural sanitary districts became rural districts from 28 December 1894. Prior to the act coming into force, Hertfordshire County Council made an order directing that the town of Hoddesdon, which was in the Ware Rural Sanitary District, should become an urban district in its own right rather than be included in the Ware Rural District. The link with the poor law union continued, with all the elected councillors of the rural district council being ex officio members of the Ware Board of Guardians.

Parishes
Ware Rural District contained the following civil parishes.

Premises

From the council's foundation until 1960 it met at the board room of the Ware Union Workhouse, later known as Western House, on Collett Road. Administrative office functions were carried out until 1934 at 8 West Street, which was shared with the Ware Urban District Council and the solicitors who acted as clerks to both councils. In 1934 the council acquired a house called The Laurels at 97 New Road, converting it to serve as offices. A council chamber was built to the rear of 97 New Road in 1960, after which the building served as both meeting place and offices for the council until its abolition. The council also built additional office space at 103 New Road in the mid 1960s.

Abolition
Ware Rural District was abolished under the Local Government Act 1972, becoming part of the new district of East Hertfordshire on 1 April 1974. The old Ware Rural District Council main office at 97 New Road was subsequently converted into flats, whilst its other office at 103 New Road was used for various local authority functions for some years, with the site being redeveloped for houses in 2015.

References

Districts of England created by the Local Government Act 1894
Districts of England abolished by the Local Government Act 1972
Rural districts of England
Local government in Hertfordshire